Felix Julius Theofil Krohn (20 May 1898 – 8 November 1963) was a Finnish conductor and composer. Krohn wrote several choral works and solo songs, but also stage and film music. As a composer, Krohn has been characterized as a sensitive romantic.

Felix Krohn was the conductor of the Finnish male choir Viipurin Lauluveikot 1929–1933 and 1941–1942.

Filmography 

 Sysmäläinen (1938)
 Vihreä kulta (1939)
 Anu ja Mikko (1940) 
 Linnaisten vihreä kamari (1945)

References

External links 
 

1898 births
1963 deaths
Finnish male composers
Finnish conductors (music)
20th-century conductors (music)
20th-century male musicians
20th-century Finnish composers